Johnny and Jonie Mosby was an American country music duo composed of Johnny Mosby and Jonie Mosby, who were husband and wife. The duo charted seventeen times on the country music charts between 1963 and 1973, in addition to releasing six albums for various labels. Five of the duo's singles made top 20 on the Hot Country Songs charts, with the highest peaks being "Trouble in My Arms" and "Just Hold My Hand", both at number twelve.

Biography
Janice Irene "Jonie" Shields (born August 10, 1940 in Van Nuys, California) and Johnny Mosby (born April 26, 1933 in Fort Smith, Arkansas) met in California when she auditioned for his orchestra. They married in 1958. They started recording for Challenge records that same year. In 1959, they made the first recording of "Tijuana Jail".

Signed to Columbia Records, the duo released its debut single, "Don't Call Me from a Honky Tonk", in 1963. It went to number thirteen on the country music charts and was followed by another Top 20 hit, the number twelve "Trouble in My Arms". By 1965, the duo released Mr. and Mrs. Country Music through Columbia, followed by The New Sweethearts of Country on the Starday Records label.

From 1967 to 1972, the Mosbys recorded for Capitol Records, reaching top 20 again with "Just Hold My Hand" and "I'm Leavin' It Up to You" at numbers twelve and eighteen. In the same timespan, the duo recorded several albums for the label. In 1971, Jonie released a solo single, "I've Been There", which peaked at number 72 on the country charts. They filed for divorce in 1973.

In 1992 at age 52, Jonie Mosby became the oldest woman to have a baby through in vitro fertilization as she gave birth to a son Morgan Bradford Mitchell by second husband, Donald Mitchell.

Johnny (John Robert) Mosby died on February 19, 2018. He was 88 years of age.

Discography

Albums

Singles

Notes
A^ B-side to "Trouble in My Arms".
B^ Peaked at No. 21  on RPM Country Tracks.

References

American country music groups
Capitol Records artists
Columbia Records artists
Country music duos
Married couples
Musical groups established in 1963